Boga is a common name for fishes and may refer to:

Haemulon vittata
Haemulon vittatum
Leporinus obtusidens

Boga may also refer to:

 Boga (soft drink), a Tunisian brand of soft drinks
 BOGA, the Bern Botanical Gardens in Switzerland
 Boga (noisemaker), from the Philippines
 Boga (Star Wars), a Varactyl from the Star Wars universe
 Lake Boga, Victoria, a postal district
 Boga, the definite form of Bogë, Albania
 Boga, the definite form of Bogë, Kosovo
 Boga (river), a tributary of the Crișul Pietros in Bihor County, Romania 
Jérémie Boga (born 1997), Ivorian footballer

See also
Boge (disambiguation)
Bogë (disambiguation)